The 2011–12 season is Rochdale's 105th year in existence and their second consecutive season in League One. Along with competing in League One, the club participated in the FA Cup, Football League Cup and Football League Trophy. The season covers the period from 1 July 2011 to 30 June 2012.

League table

Squad statistics

Appearances and goals
																								
																								

|}

Top scorers

Disciplinary record

Results

Pre-season Friendlies

League One

FA Cup

League Cup

Football League Trophy

Transfers

References

2011–12
2011–12 Football League One by team